The Frog Boys (Gaegurisonyeon) were a group of five boys who disappeared in Daegu, South Korea on March 26, 1991.

Woo Cheol-won, Jo Ho-yeon, Kim Young-gyu, Park Chan-in and Kim Jong-sik, aged between 9 and 13 years old, disappeared after searching for salamander eggs in the western outskirts of Daegu on a public holiday. Their disappearance received widespread attention and caused a national media frenzy, and President Roh Tae-woo ordered a massive manhunt by the police and military to find them.

On September 26, 2002, the remains of the boys were discovered near where they went egg searching, with some showing signs of blunt-force trauma. The investigation has been inconclusive and theories abound about their deaths. The case remains unsolved.

Victims
The five boys were between 9 and 13 years old:
Woo Cheol-won (aged 13)
Jo Ho-yeon (aged 12)
Kim Yeong-gyu (aged 11)
Park Chan-in (aged 10)
Kim Jong-sik (aged 9)

All five boys were from the Dalseo District of Daegu and attended the same elementary school. A sixth child, 9-year-old Kim Tae-ryong, left the group to go home and eat breakfast. He returned to the group after eating, but he decided not to carry on with the remainder of the boys because his mother had warned him earlier not to stray too far from home.

Circumstances and disappearance
March 26, 1991, was a public holiday in South Korea for the first ever local elections, and the boys decided to spend the day searching for salamander eggs in the streams of Mount Waryong in Dalseo on the western outskirts of Daegu. The boys never went home, and after they were reported missing, their story made national headlines. President Roh Tae-woo sent 300,000 police and military troops to search for the boys, with the searches shown on live TV. All 5 of the boys' fathers quit their jobs to look for their children around the country. Mount Waryong was searched over 500 times.

Discovery of bodies
On September 26, 2002, two men searching for acorns discovered their bodies on Mount Waryong in an area that had been searched. They first reported the remains via an anonymous phone call. Initially, the police said they thought the boys had died of hypothermia. But their parents rejected that conclusion and demanded a full investigation. The families questioned the conclusion that the boys had simply died after getting lost due to the oddities of one of the boys clothes being found tied in knots and unused bullets found in his clothes. As well the discovery of their bodies a short distance from the village in an area the boys knew well. Forensic experts found the skulls of three of the children showed blunt-force trauma, possibly from metal farming tools. Police said the children could have been killed by someone who "may have flown into a rage."

Aftermath
In 2006, the statute of limitations expired on the case.  However, in 2015, the National Assembly voted to remove the statute of limitations on first-degree murder, opening the possibility of criminal charges if a suspect is found. On the 30th anniversary of their disappearance the city of Daegu installed a memorial monument near the location called "Frog Boy Memorial and Children's Safety Prayer Monument". The Daegu Metropolitan police force also announced a new task force to review the case from the beginning and follow-up on any new information they receive.

Popular culture
The Frog Boys incident has been the subject of two films: Come Back, Frog Boys (1992) and Children (2011). Several songs also refer to the case as well as the documentary In Search of the Frog Boys (2019).

See also
List of solved missing persons cases
List of unsolved murders
Frog Boys a private secret society similar to the Skull and Bones

References

1990s missing person cases
1991 murders in South Korea
1991 in South Korea
March 1991 events in Asia
History of Daegu
Incidents of violence against boys
Male murder victims
Massacres in South Korea
Mass murder in 1991
Murdered South Korean children
People murdered in South Korea
Unsolved mass murders
Unsolved murders in South Korea